José Antonio Muñoz or simply Muñoz (born July 10, 1942) is an Argentine artist. He is most notable for his influential black-and-white artwork. His hardboiled graphic novels series Alack Sinner (with writer Carlos Sampayo) is a noted source for Frank Miller's Sin City and the artwork in 100 Bullets by Eduardo Risso.

Biography
Muñoz was born in Buenos Aires.  He studied at the Escuela Panamericana de Arte under Hugo Pratt and Alberto Breccia, and worked as an assistant to Francisco Solano López.

In 1972 he moved to Spain and then to Italy and began a collaboration with Argentine writer Carlos Sampayo which produced, among others, the detective series Alack Sinner (sometimes misspelled "Allack Sinner") and its spin-offs Joe's Bar and Sophie, as well as a comics biography of Billie Holiday.

His style is characterised by a sharp line, heavy chiaroscuro, and exaggerated, sometimes grotesque, faces and figures. His work has had a strong influence on Argentine Alberto Breccia, his teacher. Also British artists Dave McKean and Warren Pleece, and US artists Frank Miller (for part of his Sin City style) and Keith Giffen.

The cartoonist and critic Scott McCloud, in Understanding Comics (1993), wrote that "in José Muñoz's work, dense puddles of ink and fraying linework combine to evoke a world of depravity and morbid decay".

Awards
 1978: Best Foreign Realistic Work at the Angoulême International Comics Festival, France
 1983: Best Comic Book at the Angoulême International Comics Festival
 1994: Harvey Award for Best American Edition of Foreign Material
 2002: Special Prize for outstanding life’s work at the Max & Moritz Prizes, Germany
 2007: Grand Prix de la ville d'Angoulême at the Angoulême International Comics Festival, France
 2022: Platinum Konex Award for his work in the last decade, Konex Foundation, Argentina.

References

External links
 José Muñoz official website
 José Muñoz profile on Lambiek Comiclopedia
 Short bibliography of the Alack Sinner series (French and English editions)
 Large Muñoz illustrated bibliography (but sorted by last-reprint dates instead of original years) 
  Video Report   José Muñoz 2008 on OC-TV.net

 Career-wide selected art samples (French editions)
(Years from artist's signature or original publication, not later reprints)
 1983 page from Sudor Sudaca
 1987 page from Joe's Bar: Friendly Stories
 1988 page from Alack Sinner: Nicaragua
 1988 page from Play of Lights
 1991 page from Billie Holiday
 1999 page from Panna Maria
 2003 page from Backfires
 2004 page from The Book

1942 births
Living people
People from Buenos Aires
Argentine comics artists
Grand Prix de la ville d'Angoulême winners